Giovanni Marcanuova (1415-1467) was an Italian physician and antiquarian.

Biography
He was born in Padua, where he practiced medicine. But he is best known for his collection of images, some whimsical, of ancient Roman structures (Collectio antiquitatum), and other treatises on Roman customs, including De dignitibus Romanorum; De Triumpho; and  De rebus militaribus. Some of the engraved images from Collectio are attributed to Marco Zoppo. Marcanova dedicated his collection to Domenico Malatesta, the lord of Cesena and patron of the Biblioteca Malatestina. The drawings are meant to depict Roman monuments (Tomb of Hadrian, Arch of Titus, Vatican Obelisk, Baths of Diocletian, Statue of Marcus Aurelius), Tiber River, Tarpean Rock, Monte Testaccio, Campidoglio, and smarket day, human sacrifice, tournament.

References

1415 births
1467 deaths
15th-century Italian writers
Italian antiquarians